The Batu Anam railway station was a Malaysian railway halt located at Batu Anam, Segamat District, Johor.

The station is between Gemas and Segamat stations. 

KTM Intercity train services were provided at this halt, however the station is currently not in active service.

See also
 Rail transport in Malaysia

Railway stations in Johor
Segamat District